Zacharias Papantoniou (Zacharias Papandoniou) was a Greek writer. He was born in Karpenissi of Evrytania in February 1877 and died in Athens in 1940. He spent the first years of his life in Granitsa, where his father was a teacher. Apart from a writer, he was also a journalist. Papantoniou's work was basically the first to promote Evrytania. A big part of his work has not been published.

External links 

 Brief bio-bibliography (in Greek)
 
 
 Poems by Papantoniou (in Greek)
 Granitsa Evrytanias

1877 births
1940 deaths
Greek artists
Greek art critics
Greek writers
Members of the Academy of Athens (modern)

People from Karpenisi